Darren Rooney is an Irish Gaelic footballer and hurler from County Laois. His dual status makes him most unusual in the modern GAA.

He currently plays for the Parnells club in Dublin. He usually plays at right half back or full back art senior level for the Laois county team and in 2003 was part of the Laois team that won the Leinster Senior Football Championship title for the first time since 1946. Rooney was a member of the Laois minor team that retained the All-Ireland Minor Football Championship in 1997.

Honours
Leinster Minor Football Championship (1): 1997
All-Ireland Minor Football Championship (1): 1997
Leinster Senior Football Championship (1): 2003
National Hurling League Division 2 (2): 2002, 2007

External links
The Times interview
 

1979 births
Living people
Clonaslee–St Manmans Gaelic footballers
Clonaslee–St Manmans hurlers
Dual players
Laois inter-county Gaelic footballers
Laois inter-county hurlers
Parnells Gaelic footballers (Dublin)